2010 UEFA European Under-17 Football Championship (qualifying round) was the first round of qualifications for the Final Tournament of UEFA U-17 Championship 2010.  Of the 52 countries contesting in the qualifying round, 28 would advance to the elite round. 

The qualifying round was played between 5 September and 31 October 2009. The 52 teams were divided into 13 groups of four teams, with each group being contested as a mini-tournament, hosted by one of the group's teams. After all matches were played, the 13 group winners and 13 group runners-up automatically advanced to the Elite round.  If two or more teams were tied in points, a tie-breaking procedure applied according to the following criteria:
 Higher number of points obtained in the group matches played among the teams in question;
 Superior goal difference resulting from the group matches played among the teams in question;
 Higher number of goals scored in the group matches played among the teams in question;
 If, after having applied criteria 1. to 3., two teams still had an equal ranking, criteria 1. to 3. was reapplied to determine the ranking of the two teams. If this procedure did not lead to a decision, criteria 5. and 6. applied.
 Results of all group matches:
 Superior goal difference.
 Higher number of goals scored.
 Drawing of lots.

Alongside the 26 winner and runner-up teams, the two best third-placed teams also qualified. These were determined after considering only their results against their group's top two teams, and applying the following criteria in this order:
Higher number of points obtained in these matches;
Superior goal difference from these matches;
Higher number of goals scored in these matches;
Fair-play conduct of the teams in all group matches in the qualifying round;
Drawing of lots.

The host team of each group's mini-tournament are indicated in italics in the tables below.

Stages

Group 1

Group 2

Group 3

Group 4

Group 5 

Note: Turkey, Germany and Finland are ranked by the goal difference resulting from the group matches played among them: Turkey +1 (3–2), Germany +0 (2–2), Finland −1 (1–2).

Group 6

Group 7

Group 8

Group 9

Group 10

Group 11

Group 12

Group 13

Third-placed qualifiers
At the end of the first stage, a comparison is made between the third placed teams from all groups. The two best third-placed teams advanced to the next round, with only the results against the top two teams from each group to be used for classifying the teams.

References

External links 
 – uefa.com

Qualification
UEFA European Under-17 Championship qualification